Lake View Cemetery is a private cemetery located in Seattle, Washington, in the Capitol Hill neighborhood, just north of Volunteer Park. Known as "Seattle's Pioneer Cemetery," it is run by an independent, non-profit association. It was founded in 1872 as the Seattle Masonic Cemetery and later renamed for its view of Lake Washington to the east.

Interments
 Princess Angeline – daughter of Chief Seattle
 Walter B. Beals – Chief Justice Washington State Supreme Court. Presiding Judge, Nuremberg War Crimes Trials, 1946–1947.
 Beriah Brown – Mayor of Seattle
 Gottlieb Burian – Founder of the city of Burien, Washington
 Denny Party members (Seattle pioneers), including:
 Carson Boren
 Arthur A. Denny
 George Frye
 David Swinson "Doc" Maynard
 Thomas Mercer
 Tudor Ganea – mathematician
 Jesse Glover – martial artist and first student of Bruce Lee
 William Grose – second black resident of Seattle
 Granville O. Haller – businessman and military officer
 Thaddeus Hanford – Seattle newspaper editor
 Jeff Heath – Major League Baseball player
 Don A. Jones – Rear admiral in the National Oceanic and Atmospheric Administration Commissioned Officer Corps, final director of the United States Coast and Geodetic Survey, and first director of the National Ocean Service
 John Leary – Seattle pioneer, mayor, civil leader

 Bruce Lee – martial artist and actor
 Brandon Lee – martial artist, actor, and son of Bruce Lee
 The Lees' gravesites are a tourist attraction visited by thousands of people a year. It is considered one of Seattle's most famous gravesites, was listed as one of the top 10 celebrity graves in the world by Time, and is found in several Seattle travel guidebooks. In 2013, forty years after his death, on Bruce Lee's birthday, flowers were piled as high as the headstones. Lake View Cemetery did not allow Kurt Cobain to be buried there because of the already-large numbers of visitors to the Lees' graves.
 Denise Levertov – poet
 William Harvey Lillard – first chiropractic patient
 Eugene McAllaster – naval architect; designer of the fireboat Duwamish
 John W. Nordstrom – founder of Nordstrom department store
 Guy Carleton Phinney – developer whose land became the Woodland Park
 A. W. Piper – pioneer, baker, socialist Seattle City Council member, eponym of Pipers Creek and Piper Orchard
 Guendolen Plestcheeff – philanthropist and preservationist
 Captain William Renton – prominent Seattle businessman and namesake of Renton, WA
 John Saxon – Actor and Martial Artist
 Edmund A. Smith – inventor
 John Tester – Wisconsin state legislator
 George Tsutakawa – Northwest School painter and sculptor
 Cordelia Wilson – American Southwest painter
 Amy Yee – Seattle Tennis Champion
 Henry Yesler – Seattle's first economic father and first millionaire

Monuments

Lake View includes the Nisei War Memorial Monument, a 21-foot column erected in 1949, listing the names of 47 Japanese American soldiers from Seattle who were killed during World War II. The Nisei Veterans Committee, in response to the US Army's plans in late 1947 to return Washington's Nisei war dead, began a door-to-door fundraising campaign in the Puget Sound region, collecting donations of $1 to $5, and raising over $10,000 to construct the memorial. Later, 9 more names of Seattle area service members of Japanese ancestry killed in Korea, Vietnam and Granada were added to names on the memorial.

The cemetery has a memorial to Confederate veterans erected in 1926 by Seattle's chapter of the United Daughters of the Confederacy, near the site of 11 graves, the only burial ground in the Northwest of Confederate soldiers. During the 2020 George Floyd protests, the memorial was toppled by unknown persons on July 3, 2020. It had been criticized by protestors, and targeted with vandalism and graffiti in recent years.

See also
 Grand Army of the Republic Cemetery (Seattle)

References

Sources

External links

 

 
Capitol Hill, Seattle
Cemeteries in Seattle